Omišalj is a coastal municipality in the north-west of the island of Krk in Croatia. The population of Omišalj itself is 1,868 (2011), while the municipality also includes the nearby village of Njivice, bringing the total up to 2,983 people. Omišalj is best known in modern times for hosting the Rijeka Airport as well as Port of Rijeka oil terminal.

History
Omišalj is located close to one of the oldest settlements on Krk, dating from the 1st century, when it was built by the Romans and named Fulfinum. The town was built on the cliff overlooking the bay of Kvarner, some 80 meters above sea level.
It is the site of an early Christian basilica. The town was referred to in the 12th century as "Castri musculi": this is from the Latin Ad musculi meaning "the place of shells".

The land between the castles of Dobrinj and Omišalj, as well as the areas in and around Dubašnica and Poljica, were settled by Vlachs and Morlachs (originally Romanians who later diverged into Istro-Romanians) by Ivan VII Frankopan during the second half of the 15th century. They formed a community in the island of Krk that would last until 1875, when the last speaker of the Istro-Romanian dialect of the island died.

Folk Theater Festival
Every year in Omišalj takes place the Festival pučkog teatra ("Folk Theater Festival"), which is a "a kind of celebration of folk dramatic expression." The performances take place on Prikešte Square in Omišalj and in the old castle in the town of Grobnik, Primorje-Gorski Kotar County.

References

External links 

 
 https://web.archive.org/web/20041215023052/http://www.krkinfo.com/omisalj.htm
 http://www.croatiainfo.net/e_Omisalj.html
 http://www.janaf.hr/
 http://www.islandkrk.com/

Krk
Municipalities of Croatia
Populated places in Primorje-Gorski Kotar County
Seaside resorts in Croatia